Charles Gordon, 11th Marquess of Huntly, PC, DL, JP (5 March 1847 – 20 February 1937), styled Lord Strathavon until 1853 and Earl of Aboyne between 1853 and 1863, was a Scottish Liberal politician. He served under William Ewart Gladstone, he was appointed Captain of the Honourable Corps of Gentlemen-at-Arms between January and June 1881.

Background and education
Huntly was the son of Charles Gordon, 10th Marquess of Huntly, by his second wife Maria Antoinette, daughter of Reverend Peter William Pegus, and succeeded to the marquessate in 1863 at the age of sixteen. He was educated at Eton and Trinity College, Cambridge.

Political career
In 1870 Huntly was appointed a Lord-in-waiting (government whip in the House of Lords) in the first Liberal administration of William Ewart Gladstone, a post he held until 1873, and served from January to June 1881 as Captain of the Honourable Corps of Gentlemen-at-Arms (government chief whip in the House of Lords) in Gladstone's second administration. In 1881 he was sworn of the Privy Council.

Apart from his political career, Lord Huntly was Lord Rector of the University of Aberdeen between 1890, 1893 and 1896. He also published Auld Acquaintances and Milestones and edited Records of Aboyne. He was also a member of Huntingdonshire County Council.

Family
Lord Huntly married firstly Amy, daughter of Sir William Cunliffe Brooks, 1st Baronet, in 1869. After her death in 1920 he married secondly Charlotte Isabella, daughter of John H. Fallon and widow of James McDonald, in 1922. Both marriages were childless. Huntly died in February 1937, aged 89, and was succeeded in the marquessate by his great-nephew, Douglas Gordon. The Marchioness of Huntly died in May 1939.

References

Work cited

External links

1847 births
1937 deaths
Alumni of Trinity College, Cambridge
Deputy Lieutenants of Aberdeen
People educated at Eton College
Rectors of the University of Aberdeen
Honourable Corps of Gentlemen at Arms
11
Earls of Aboyne
Members of the Privy Council of the United Kingdom